Benjamin Sirimou (born 29 May 1969) is a Cameroonian sprinter.

At the 1996 African Championships he won the silver medals in the 100 metres. He also competed at the World Championships in 1995 and 1997, as well as in 4 x 100 m relay at the 1996 and 2000 Summer Olympics without reaching the final.

References

External links
 

1969 births
Living people
Cameroonian male sprinters
Athletes (track and field) at the 1996 Summer Olympics
Athletes (track and field) at the 2000 Summer Olympics
Olympic athletes of Cameroon
Athletes (track and field) at the 1998 Commonwealth Games
Commonwealth Games competitors for Cameroon
20th-century Cameroonian people